Havergal Brian (born William Brian; 29 January 187628 November 1972) was an English composer. He is best known for having composed 32 symphonies (an unusually high total for a 20th-century composer), most of them late in his life. His best-known work is his Symphony No. 1, The Gothic, which calls for some of the largest orchestral forces demanded by a conventionally structured concert work. He also composed five operas and a number of other orchestral works, as well as songs, choral music and a small amount of chamber music. Brian enjoyed a period of popularity earlier in his career and rediscovery in the 1950s, but public performances of his music have remained rare and he has been described as a cult composer. He continued to be extremely productive late into his career, composing large works even into his nineties, most of which remained unperformed during his lifetime.

Life

Early life
William Brian (he adopted the name "Havergal" from a family of hymn-writers, of whom Frances Ridley Havergal was most prominent) was from the Potteries district of Staffordshire. He was born in Dresden, a suburb of Longton, one of the towns which make up what is now the city of Stoke-on-Trent. He was one of a very small number of composers to originate from the English working class. 

Brian's earliest musical education appears to have been as a choirboy; he sang in the choir at St James' church in Longton. In 1887 he and other choristers from his home town participated in a concert in Lichfield Cathedral marking the Jubilee of Queen Victoria. This experience gave the boy an interest in large-scale musical effects. At the age of 12, after leaving the elementary school attached to the church, he started work (he tried a variety of trades). In his spare time, he continued to study music including the organ for which he showed talent at a young age; as a composer he was virtually self-taught. 
From 1896 he was organist of All Saints', a Gothic Revival church in Odd Rode, just across the county border in Cheshire. The post involved playing at Sunday services; his main job at this time was with a timber company.

Around the time he started at All Saints', he was influenced by hearing King Olaf, a composition for soloists, choir and orchestra by Edward Elgar. Now one of the composer's lesser-known works, King Olaf was commissioned for the North Staffordshire Music Festival of 1896, where it was well received. Brian sent a sample composition to Elgar who gave him encouragement. Brian became a fervent enthusiast of the new music being produced by Richard Strauss and the British composers of the day. Through attending music festivals he began a lifelong friendship with composer Granville Bantock (1868–1946).

In 1898, Brian married Isabel Priestley, by whom he had five children. One of his sons was named Sterndale after the English composer Sir William Sterndale Bennett.

Full-time composer
In 1907 Brian was offered a yearly income of £500 (then a respectable lower-middle-class salary) by a local wealthy businessman, Herbert Minton Robinson, to enable him to devote all his time to composition. It seems Robinson expected Brian soon to become successful and financially independent on the strength of his compositions, and initially Brian indeed found success: his first English Suite attracted the attention of Henry J. Wood, who performed it at the London Proms in 1907. The work proved popular and Brian obtained a publisher and performances for his next few orchestral works, although this initial success was not maintained. For a while Brian worked on a number of ambitious large-scale choral and orchestral works, but felt no urgency to finish them, and began to indulge in pleasures such as expensive foods and a trip to Italy.

Arguments over the money and an affair with a young servant, Hilda Mary Hayward (1894-1980), led to the collapse of his first marriage in 1913. Brian fled to London and, although Robinson (who disapproved of the incident) continued to provide him with money until his own death, most of the allowance went to Brian's estranged wife after 1913. The affair with Hilda turned into a lifelong relationship: Brian and she began living together as man and wife, and after Isabel's death in 1933 they were married, by which point Hilda had already borne him another five children. No longer able to rely on Robinson's support, in London Brian began composing copiously whilst living in poverty. On the outbreak of World War I he volunteered for the Honourable Artillery Company but saw no service before he was invalided out with a hand injury. He subsequently worked at the Audit Office of the Canadian Expeditionary Force until December 1915. The family then moved to Erdington, near Birmingham, Warwickshire, until May 1919 and then spent several years in various locations in Sussex. His brief war service gave him the material for his first opera The Tigers. In the 1920s he turned to composing symphonies, though he had written more than ten before one of them was first performed in the early 1950s. Brian eventually obtained work of a musical kind, copying and arranging, and writing for the journal The British Bandsman. In 1927, he became assistant editor of the journal Musical Opinion and moved back to London.

In 1940 he retired, living firstly in London, and then in Shoreham-by-Sea, Sussex. Freed from the requirement to work to make a living, he was able to devote all of his time to composition, and the bulk of his compositional output belongs to the last three decades of his life, including four of the five operas (composed between 1951 and 1957) and twenty-seven of the thirty-two symphonies (composed from 1948 onwards). Through most of the 1960s, Brian composed two or three symphonies each year.

This late flurry of activity coincided with something of a rediscovery, in part due to the efforts of Robert Simpson, himself a significant composer and BBC Music Producer, who asked Sir Adrian Boult to programme the Eighth Symphony in 1954. A number of Brian works received their public premieres during this time, including the Gothic Symphony. Written decades earlier between 1919 and 1927, it was premiered in a partly amateur performance in 1961 at Westminster Central Hall, conducted by Bryan Fairfax. A fully professional performance followed in 1966 at the Royal Albert Hall, conducted by Boult. The latter performance was broadcast live, encouraging considerable interest, and by his death six years later several of his works had been performed, along with the first commercial recordings of Brian's music. For a few years after Brian's death there was a revival of interest in Brian with a number of further recordings and performances; two biographies and a three-volume study of his symphonies appeared.

Renowned conductor Leopold Stokowski heard the Sinfonia Tragica (No. 6) and let it be known that he would like to perform a Brian work. The result was the world premiere in 1973 of the 28th Symphony, in a BBC broadcast produced by Robert Simpson in Maida Vale Studio 1, and played by the New Philharmonia Orchestra. Anthony Payne in his Daily Telegraph review wrote: "It was fascinating to contemplate the uniqueness of the event – a 91-year-old conductor learning a new work by a 91-year-old composer."

Music

Stylistically, Brian's music could broadly be described as being in a late romantic idiom, exhibiting the influence of Gustav Mahler in his ambitious orchestration and progressive tonality. A Germanophile – the text of the Psalms in his fourth symphony is sung in German – Brian's main musical influences are primarily Germanic composers like Wagner, Bruckner, Strauss, Mahler and Bach, as well as Elgar. Brian's music is fundamentally tonal rather than atonal and shows little or no influence of dodecaphony; however, it is often punctuated with violent and occasionally dissonant passages.

Brian's music has several recognisable hallmarks: the liking of extreme dotted rhythms, deep brass notes, and various uncharacteristic harp, piano and percussion timbres, and other unusual orchestral sounds and textures. Also typical are moments of stillness, such as the slow harp arpeggio that is heard near the beginning and ending of the Eighth Symphony. Arguably, his music's most notable characteristic however is its restlessness: rarely does one mood persist for long before it is contrasted, often abruptly, with another. Even in Brian's slow movements, lyrical meditation does not often structure the music for long before restless thoughts intrude. Although the fragmentary nature of his music militates against classical thematic unity, he often employs structural blocks of sound, where similar rhythms and thematic material allude to previous passages (as opposed to classical statement and recapitulation). However fragmentary Brian's music is, he maintains symphonic cohesion by long-term tonal processes (similar to Carl Nielsen's "progressive tonality"), where the music is aiming towards a key, rather than being in a home key and returning to it.

Like Bach and Bruckner, Brian was an organist, and the organ repertoire influenced his musical habits (and the organ appears in several of his symphonies). Other sources of influence are late Victorian street music, and particularly brass and military bands: although he composed little dedicated music for brass band, brass instruments are often prominent in Brian's orchestral music, as are marches.

Although he wrote music in a range of forms, Brian's most famous legacy is his cycle of 32 symphonies. His first canonical symphony – an earlier Fantastic Symphony was withdrawn – is the colossal Gothic Symphony, a performance of which last almost two hours and requires enormous orchestral and choral forces. It was completed in 1927. Although the Gothic is by far Brian's best-known work, and perhaps the work by which he has come to be defined, it is not representative of his symphonies as a whole. Few of Brian's symphonies call for larger forces than a typical 20th-century symphony orchestra – although No. 4 (Das Siegeslied) calls for a large choir and soprano soloist – and a typical Brian symphony lasts approximately twenty minutes in performance. Brian usually alludes to the classical four-movement structure of the symphony, even in single-movement works. His sixth symphony was composed at the age of 72, and the majority of Brian's symphonies were composed in rapid succession in the last two decades of his life, in his 80s and even into his 90s. Most were unperformed during Brian's own life, although all thirty-two have since been recorded.

In addition to symphonies, Brian also composed several large operas in the 1950s. In 1997, Brian's 1951 opera in eight scenes The Cenci, based on the 1819 play by Percy Bysshe Shelley, was premiered in a concert performance by the Millennium Sinfonia, conducted by James Kelleher, at the Queen Elizabeth Hall, London.

Reception and legacy
Brian's musical influence was limited by the fact that so little of his music was performed or recorded until after his death, by which time his stylistic idiom could be considered anachronistic. Nonetheless, he was held in high regard by composers such as Robert Simpson and some of his contemporaries, such as Granville Bantock. His music has generally been championed by a small number of enthusiasts rather than enjoying a more general popularity, and continues to divide opinion. To Mark Morris, writing in his Guide to Twentieth Century Composers, in the Gothic Symphony Brian achieved "one of the world's artistic masterpieces, in vision, grandeur, and in the combination of complexity and luminosity worthy to stand alongside the great cathedrals of the age that inspired it... [it] is arguably, more than any other late-Romantic work, the climax of the Romantic age.". Writing in The Spectator in 2016, Damian Thompson claimed that if Brian's thirtieth symphony were premiered today as the work of a 25-year-old composer, it "might even be hailed as the triumphant reinvention of tonality".

Others have been more critical, however. Reviewing the 2011 performance of the Gothic Symphony at the BBC Proms David Nice of The Arts Desk described the work as a "terrible, inchoate mess" and "Big, long, and very short on great ideas"; writing in The Guardian, Andrew Clements described it as featuring "moments of striking originality, particularly the sparer, more spectral ideas, but much more is either entirely unmemorable or simply grotesquely odd, and often hopelessly over-scored. Ideas come and go; for a work that lasts nearly two hours, the music is surprisingly short-winded."

In 2022 Brian's Legend for violin and piano was featured in the BBC Proms.

List of works

These lists follow the Havergal Brian Society's Extant Works (ordered by type):

Operas
 The Tigers (1917–29)
 Agamemnon (1957)
 The Cenci (1951–52)
 Faust (1955–56)
 Turandot, Prinzessin von China (1951)

Symphonies

 Symphony No. 1 in D minor (The Gothic) (1919–27), for SATB soli, children's choir, two double choirs & orchestra
 Symphony No. 2 in E minor (1930–31)
 Symphony No. 3 in C-sharp minor (1931–32)
 Symphony No. 4, "Das Siegeslied" (1932–33), for soprano, double choir & orchestra
 Symphony No. 5, "Wine of Summer" (1937), for baritone & orchestra
 Symphony No. 6, "Sinfonia Tragica" (1948)
 Symphony No. 7 in C major (1948)
 Symphony No. 8 in B-flat minor (1949)
 Symphony No. 9 in A minor (1951)
 Symphony No. 10 in C minor (1953–54)
 Symphony No. 11 in B-flat minor (1954)
 Symphony No. 12 (1957)
 Symphony No. 13 in C major (1959)
 Symphony No. 14 in F minor (1959–60)
 Symphony No. 15 in A major (1960)
 Symphony No. 16 in C-sharp minor (1960)
 Symphony No. 17 (1960–61)
 Symphony No. 18 (1961)
 Symphony No. 19 in E minor (1961)
 Symphony No. 20 in C-sharp minor (1962)
 Symphony No. 21 in E-flat major (1963)
 Symphony No. 22, "Symphonia Brevis" (1964–65)
 Symphony No. 23 (1965)
 Symphony No. 24 in D major (1965)
 Symphony No. 25 in A minor (1965–66)
 Symphony No. 26 (1966)
 Symphony No. 27 in C major (1966)
 Symphony No. 28 in C minor (1967)
 Symphony No. 29 in E-flat major (1967)
 Symphony No. 30 in B-flat minor (1967)
 Symphony No. 31 (1968)
 Symphony No. 32 in A-flat (1968)

Other orchestral music

 Abend, from "Faust" (1956)
 Burlesque Variations on an Original Theme (1903)
 Concerto for Orchestra (1964)
 Doctor Merryheart, Comedy Overture No. 1 (1911–12)
 Elegy, Symphonic Poem (1954)
 English Suite 1 (?1902-04)
 English Suite 3 (1919–21)
 English Suite 4 "Kindergarten" (?1924)
 English Suite 5 "Rustic Scenes" (1953)
 Fanfare, from "The Cenci", Banqueting Scene (1951)
 Fanfare, from "The Cenci", Scene 7 (1951)
 Fantastic Variations on an Old Rhyme (1907) – Derived from the withdrawn Fantastic Symphony
 Festal Dance (1908)  – Derived from the withdrawn Fantastic Symphony
 Festival Fanfare (1967), for brass
 Flourish, from "The Cenci" (1951)
 For Valour, Overture (1902, rev 1906)
 Gargoyles, from "The Tigers" (1921–22)
 Green Pastures, from "The Tigers" (1921–22)
 In Memoriam, Symphonic Poem (1910)
 The Jolly Miller, Comedy Overture No. 3 (1962)
 Lacryma, from "The Tigers" (1921–22)
 Legend "Ave atque vale" (1968)
 Night Ride of Faust and Mephistopheles, from "Faust" (1956)
 Prelude, from Faust Act 2 (1956)
 Preludio Tragico, Overture to "The Cenci" (1951)
 Shadow Dance, from "The Tigers" (1921–22)
 Symphonic Variations, from "The Tigers" (1921–22)
 The Tinker's Wedding, Comedy Overture No. 2 (1948)
 Three Pieces from Turandot, from "Turandot" Act I (1950-51/1962)
 Turandot Suite, from "Turandot" Acts II & III (1950–51)
 Wild Horsemen, from "The Tigers" (1921–22)

Concerti

 Cello Concerto (1964)
 Violin Concerto (1935)

Chorus, with or without piano

 Introit (1924), unaccompanied
 27 unaccompanied partsongs
 36 accompanied partsongs, with piano, one with flute & harp; 7 of which are unison songs

Voice and orchestra

 Cathedral scene, from "Faust" Act 3 (1956), soprano, bass, choir & orchestra
 Gretchen songs, from "Faust" (1956), soprano & orchestra
 Herrick songs (1912), soprano, alto & orchestra
 Psalm 23 (1901, reconstructed 1945), tenor, choir & orchestra

Voice and piano

 32 Songs

Chamber ensemble

 Legend (1919?), violin & piano

Piano

 Double Fugue in E-flat (1924)
 Three Illuminations (1916), with speaker
 Four Miniatures (1919–20)
 Prelude "John Dowland's Fancy"  (1934)
 Prelude and Fugue in C minor (1924)
 Prelude and Fugue in D minor/major (1924)

Transcriptions

 Various on works by Arne, J.C. Bach, J.S. Bach, Berlioz, Elgar Glinka, Gluck, Handel, (Basil) Maine, Spontini and Wagner

Recordings
The first commercial recording of Havergal Brian's music was made by the Leicestershire Schools Symphony Orchestra in 1972, when Symphonies Nos. 10 and 21, conducted by James Loughran and Eric Pinkett respectively, were recorded at the De Montfort Hall, Leicester. The producer was Robert Simpson. The LP was released by Unicorn Records in 1973. A special edition of the television programme Aquarius called The Unknown Warrior gave considerable coverage to the recording session and a camera crew joined members of the orchestra during a visit they made to the composer's home in Shoreham.

During the 1970s a number of unofficial releases of Brian symphonies were made. These generally were of BBC recordings, and the recordings were released under fictitious names. Several have now had official releases.

In 1979, Cameo Classics embarked on a project to record all of Brian's orchestral music in collaboration with the Havergal Brian Society. It started with the English Suite No. 1, Doctor Merryheart, and Fantastic Variations on an Old Rhyme. In 1980 came the second LP containing In Memoriam, For Valour, and Festal Dance. The project was completed in 1981 with the recordings of Burlesque Variations on an Original Theme, and Two Herrick Songs, Requiem for the Rose and The Hag. The recordings were produced by David Kent-Watson with the Hull Youth Orchestra conducted by Geoffrey Heald-Smith. For the recording of Brian's complete piano music, Cameo Classics employed digital technology. Peter Hill's performances on a Bösendorfer Imperial at the Northern College of Music earned high praise from John Ogdon in his review for Tempo.

More of Brian's works have been published since the 1980s and '90s, and the scarcity of well-rehearsed performances or mature interpretations that had previously made the quality of his music difficult to assess has been partially corrected through the series of professional recordings of many of Brian's symphonies that have been issued by the Marco Polo record label on CD. Many of the original recordings on various labels are being reissued, and by the end of 2018 all of Brian's symphonies had at least one official recording, although not necessarily in print.

In August 2010, the Dutton CD label issued three works taken from 1959 BBC broadcasts: the Comedy Overture Doctor Merryheart and 11th Symphony (with Harry Newstone conducting the London Symphony Orchestra) and the 9th Symphony (Norman del Mar and the LSO). This release followed on from Testament's reissue of the live recording of the 1966 Boult performance in the Royal Albert Hall of Brian's Gothic Symphony. In the 2011 Proms concert season the symphony was conducted by Martyn Brabbins in the Royal Albert Hall; the performance is now available on a commercial recording.

In July 2012, a documentary film, "The Curse of the Gothic Symphony" was released in Australian cinemas. Directed by Randall Wood, it is a dramatised documentary of the trials and tribulations of staging Brian's Gothic Symphony in Brisbane, Queensland. Filmed over five years, the enormous task of gathering 200 musicians and 400 choristers came to fruition in 2010 in a triumphal performance and standing ovation in Brisbane's Performing Arts centre.

Recordings of the symphonies
Here is a partial list of known recordings for Havergal Brian's symphonies; many are out of print, others have never been released commercially; some have been released in bootleg format or exist in BBC archives:

&=out of print LP
&&=released on a pirated LP with apocryphal attributions to Horst Werner (conductor)/ Hamburg Philharmonic
&&&= released in a (pirated) LP box-set with (presumed) apocryphal attributions to John Freedman (conductor)/ Edinburgh Youth Symphony Orchestras
&&&&=recording from original BBC broadcast exists, not commercially released
&&&&&=recording from BBC radio 3 exists, not commercially released; a pirated LP (Aries LP-1607) with apocryphal attributions to Horst Werner (conductor)/ Hamburg Philharmonic is reported and refers to this Stokowski performance d=cd was made, but is now deleted from cataloguee'=recording is in the public domain and is available from the Havergal Brian Society webpage 
Both the Leicestershire Schools Symphony Orchestra recordings have been remastered and rereleased.
Many of the BBC recordings are freely available for download with registration.

Footnotes

References

Books
 Eastaugh, Kenneth. Havergal Brian, the making of a composer. London: Harrap. c 1976. 
 MacDonald, Malcolm. The Symphonies of Havergal Brian (Discussion in 3 volumes—volume 1: Symphonies 1–12; volume 2: Symphonies 13–29; volume 3: Symphonies 30–32, Survey, and Summing-up.) London: Kahn & Averill, 1974–1983. .
 MacDonald, Malcolm, ed. Havergal Brian on music: selections from his journalism. London: Toccata Press, c 1986.  (v.1).
 Nettel, Reginald. Ordeal by Music: The Strange Experience of Havergal Brian. London and New York: Oxford University Press. c 1945.
 Nettel, Reginald (also Foreman, Lewis). Havergal Brian and his music''. London: Dobson. c 1976. .
 Matthew-Walker, Robert. "Havergal Brian: Reminiscences and Observations". DGR Books 1995. .

External links
Havergal Brian Society website
The Life of Brian Reflections by a choral conductor involved in the 1970s recordings by the LSSO (Copper Magazine, Issue 77)

1876 births
1972 deaths
People from Erdington
20th-century classical composers
20th-century English composers
English classical composers
English male classical composers
People from Longton, Staffordshire
20th-century British male musicians
British Army personnel of World War I
Honourable Artillery Company soldiers